Isabel Van Devanter Sawhill is a senior fellow at The Brookings Institution, where she formerly held the position of vice president and director of Economic Studies, among other duties.  She has authored or co-authored many books, including Generation Unbound: Drifting Into Sex and Parenthood Without Marriage, and Creating an Opportunity Society with Ron Haskins. She won a Daniel Patrick Moynihan prize with Ron Haskins.

Background
Sawhill received her Ph.D. in 1968 from New York University.

Prior to joining The Brookings Institution, Sawhill worked at the Urban Institute. She served as an Associate Director in the Office of Management and Budget during the first term of the Clinton Administration.

Sawhill co-founded the nonprofit organization The National Campaign to Prevent Teen and Unplanned Pregnancy and serves on other nonprofit boards. She is a senior editor of The Future of Children, a joint effort with Princeton University.

Awards and recognition
 2014, Exemplar Award from the Association for Public Policy Analysis and Management.
 2016, Daniel Patrick Moynihan Prize (with Ron Haskins), from the American Academy of Political and Social Science.
 2016, named a Distinguished Fellow by the American Economic Association.

Further reading
"A Longtime Proponent of Marriage Wants to Reassess the Institution's Future" profile in The Washington Post by Bridget Schulte, January 3, 2015.
"Twenty Years Later, It Turns Out Dan Quayle Was Right About Murphy Brown and Unmarried Moms" op-ed by Sawhill in The Washington Post, May 25, 2012.
"Creating an Opportunity Society", by Sawhill and Ron Haskins. Washington, DC: Brookings Press, 2009.
"Generation Unbound" by Sawhill. Washington, DC: Brookings Press, 2014.
"Beyond Marriage" op-ed by Sawhill in The New York Times, September 13, 2014.
 Restoring Fiscal Sanity: How to Balance the Budget, with Alice Rivlin.
 One Percent for the Kids: New Policies, Brighter Futures for America's Children
 Getting Ahead: Economic and Social Mobility in America

Bibliography

Ron Haskins; Isabel Sawhill Creating an Opportunity Society, Washington : The Brookings Institution, 2009. , 
One percent for the kids : new policies, brighter futures for America's children, Washington, D.C. : Brookings Institution Press, 2003. ,  
Generation Unbound: Drifting Into Sex and Parenthood Without Marriage Washington, D.C. : Brookings Institution Press, 2014. , 
The Forgotten Americans: An Economic Agenda for a Divided Nation New Haven : Yale University Press, 2018. ,

References

External links

1937 births
Distinguished Fellows of the American Economic Association
Living people
New York University alumni
Radical centrist writers
Brookings Institution people